is a Japanese professional sumo wrestler from Kotohira, Kagawa. He made his professional debut in March 2007, joining Oguruma stable, and reached the top makuuchi division in September 2016. His highest rank has been maegashira 13. He has one jūryō division championship or yūshō.

Career

He had been active in judo since before elementary school, and won the Shikoku junior high school competition. He was spotted by former ozeki Kotokaze and recruited to his Oguruma stable at the age of 15. He made his debut in March 2007, fighting under his own surname of Kawanari. He was the first wrestler from Kagawa Prefecture since the retirement of Gokenzan in November 2006. He reached the sandanme division in 2008 and the third highest makushita division in 2009. He rose to the top of the makushita division in March 2013, where he was on the verge of promotion to elite sekitori status but fell short with a make-koshi or losing 1–6 record. He failed again at makushita 3 in November 2013, and then missed the January 2014 tournament through injury. After making attempts to lose weight his results began to improve and he earned promotion to the jūryō division after the January 2015 tournament.

To celebrate his promotion to sekitori status he changed his shikona from his real name to Amakaze. He chose the shikona himself, with "kaze" (wind) being a suffix used by all wrestlers at Oguruma stable, and "Ama" taken from Amanogawa (the Milky Way), because his birthday of July 7 co-incides with the start of Tanabata (Star Festival) celebrations. The same kanji is also used for a river near his parents' home in Kotohira. He commented on his new name, "It means looking up to the heavens, it's good" but his stablemaster joked that he should take care not to become an "Ama-chan", or one who takes things lightly.

Amakaze came through with a winning record in his second division debut of ten wins against five losses, and in July 2016 he won the jūryō division championship or yūshō with a 13–2 record. This earned him promotion to the top makuuchi division for the first time, joining his veteran stablemates Takekaze and Yoshikaze. Working his way up the ranks Amakaze had served as a tsukebito, or personal attendant to Takekaze. Ranked at maegashira 13 in his makuuchi debut in September 2016, he managed only five wins against ten losses and was demoted straight back to jūryō. For the next eight tournaments he held his own in jūryō but did not look like earning promotion back to makuuchi. In March 2018 a poor 3–12 record caused his demotion to makushita which he followed up with another poor 2–6 record in May 2018. He injured his knee in his first bout in July 2018 and withdrew from the tournament. He did not compete again until March 2019, by which time he had fallen to the jonidan division. In this tournament he fought another former makuuchi wrestler, Terunofuji. He won promotion back to makushita for the January 2020 tournament, but fell to sandanme in March 2022.

Personal
Amakaze is known for his sense of fun and love of food, and enjoys posting photos of himself and fellow wrestlers at leisure on social media. In 2015 a video of himself and two other wrestlers attempting a 40-yard dash while on a tour in Wakayama went viral.

Fighting style
His preferred grip is hidari-yotsu, a right arm outside, left arm inside position. Roughly half of his winning bouts are with the yori-kiri technique. His other regular winning kimarite include oshi-dashi (push out) and hataki-komi (slap down).

Career record

See also
Glossary of sumo terms
List of active sumo wrestlers
List of sumo second division tournament champions

References

External links

1991 births
Living people
Japanese sumo wrestlers
Sumo people from Kanagawa Prefecture